Calandrinia corrigioloides  is an annual herb in the family Montiaceae, and is native to  Western Australia, South Australia, and Victoria.

Description
It is a succulent, prostrate herb,  with  pink-white flowers. It flowers from August to November and grows on sandy soils in swampy depressions, flats, and sand dunes.
The stems of the flowers (pedicels) are 0.5–2 mm long and spreading to reflexed in fruit. The  bracts are leafy and alternate, the sepals are persistent and the 4 or 5  petals are white to pale-pink. There are 3 to 4 stamens  and 3  stigmas 3 which are free to the base. The capsule is three valved and narrow-ovoid to elongate-cylindrical, and the seeds are black, shiny, and smooth and 0.7–1 mm in diameter.

Taxonomy
Calandrinia corrigioloides was first described by Ferdinand von Mueller in 1863.

References

External links

Australasian Virtual Herbarium - Occurrence data for Calandrinia corrigioloides
VicFlora: Calandrinia corrigioloides. Royal Botanic Gardens Foundation Victoria

corrigioloides
Angiosperms of Western Australia
Flora of South Australia
Flora of Victoria (Australia)
Plants described in 1863
Taxa named by Ferdinand von Mueller